Sahbi Karoui is a member of the African Union's Pan-African Parliament representing Tunisia.

See also
 List of members of the Pan-African Parliament

References

Members of the Pan-African Parliament from Tunisia
Presidents of the Chamber of Deputies (Tunisia)
Living people
Year of birth missing (living people)